Montepulciano is a medieval and Renaissance hill town and comune in the Italian province of Siena in southern Tuscany.

Montepulciano is a wine-producing region. The Vino Nobile di Montepulciano has Denominazione di origine controllata e garantita status and is, with the Brunello di Montalcino and Chianti Classico, one of the principal red wines of Tuscany. The Rosso di Montepulciano and Vin Santo di Montepulciano have Denominazione di origine controllata status.

History
According to legend, it was founded by the Etruscan King Lars Porsena of Clusium (modern Chiusi). Recent findings prove that a settlement was in existence in the 4th-3rd centuries BC. In Roman times it was the seat of a garrison guarding the main roads of the area.

After the fall of the Western Roman Empire, it developed as a religious center under the Lombards. In the 12th century it was repeatedly attacked by the Republic of Siena, which the Poliziani faced with the help of the Perugia and Orvieto, and sometimes Florence, communes. The 14th century was characterized by constant struggles between the local noble families, until the Del Pecora family became rulers of the town. From 1390, Montepulciano was a loyal ally (and later possession) of Florence and, until the mid-16th century, lived a period of splendour with architects such as Antonio da Sangallo the Elder, Jacopo Barozzi da Vignola, Baldassarre Peruzzi, Ippolito Scalza and others, building luxurious residences and other edifices here. In 1559, when Siena was conquered by Florence and Montepulciano lost its strategic role, its importance declined.

After the unification of Italy and the drying of the Val di Chiana, the town remained the most important agricultural centre in the area, while the industrial activities moved mostly next to Chiusi, which was nearer to the railroad being built in that period.

A competitive "barrel race through the city" called the Bravio delle botti has been held on the last Sunday of August since the 14th Century.

Main sights
Since the Second World War, tourism has been a significant aspect in the economy of the urban part of the commune. Many of the streets are designated as car-free. Most of the shops and restaurants are on the main street, which stretches from Porta Al Prato to Piazza Grande

The main landmarks include:
 Palazzo Comunale: city hall designed by Michelozzo recalling the Palazzo della Signoria (Palazzo Vecchio) of Florence.
 Palazzo Tarugi, attributed to Antonio da Sangallo the Elder or Jacopo Barozzi da Vignola. It is entirely in travertine, with a portico which was once open to the public.
 Santa Maria Assunta Cathedral, or the Duomo of Montepulciano, constructed between 1594 and 1680, includes a masterpiece from the Sienese School, a massive Assumption of the Virgin triptych painted by Taddeo di Bartolo in 1401.
 Santa Maria delle Grazie: late 16th-century) church with a simple Mannerist façade with a three-arcade portico. The interior has a single nave, and houses a precious terracotta altar by Andrea della Robbia.
 Madonna di San Biagio Sanctuary: church, located on the road to Chianciano outside the city, it is a typical 16th century Tuscan edifice, designed by Antonio da Sangallo the Elder on a pre-existing Pieve, between 1518 and 1545. It has a circular (central) plan with a large dome over a terrace and a squared tambour. The exterior, with two bell towers, is built in white travertine.
 Santa Lucia: Baroque church with altarpiece by Luca Signorelli.
Museo Civico di Montepulciano: located in the Palazzo Neri Orselli, displaying a collection of archeologic items, paintings, and terracotta works by the Della Robbia family.

Notable people
 St. Robert Bellarmine, a Roman Catholic Saint, Cardinal, and Doctor of the Church was born here on October 4, 1542.
 Agnes of Montepulciano, a Roman Catholic Saint, was born here in the neighbourhood of Montepulciano 1268.
 The Florentine classical scholar and poet Angelo Poliziano was born in Montepulciano on July 14, 1454.
The Baroque composer and violinist Giovanni Antonio Pandolfi was born in Montepulciano in 1624.
 The members of the music band "Baustelle", formed in 1994, have origins in the town.
 Notable International actors, playwrights, and diplomats reside in the town.

Municipal government

The  is chaired by the mayor, who appoints others members, called .

Since 1995 the mayor of Montepulciano is directly elected by citizens, originally every four, then every five years. The current mayor is Michele Angiolini (PD), elected on 26 May 2019 with the 56.2% of the votes.

Twin towns—sister cities

Montepulciano is twinned with:

  Moulins, France

Gallery

See also
 Bruscello

References

External links

 
 

 
Hilltowns in Tuscany